USS Comfort may refer to the following ships operated by the United States:  

, a hospital ship, was acquired in 1917 and served until 1921

United States Navy ship names

ja:コンフォート (病院船)